Úlice is a municipality and village in Plzeň-North District in the Plzeň Region of the Czech Republic. It has about 400 inhabitants.

Administrative parts
Villages of Hracholusky, Jezná, Kníje and Nová Jezná are administrative parts of Úlice.

References

Villages in Plzeň-North District